Janelle Cole (born October 19, 1996) is an American racing cyclist, who most recently rode for American amateur team Fast Chance Women's Cycling. Prior to her cycling career, Cole competed in inline speed skating. She finished seventh in the 2015 Tour of America's Dairyland, and was the best young rider at the 2017 Joe Martin Stage Race.

See also
 List of 2016 UCI Women's Teams and riders

References

External links
 
 

1996 births
Living people
American female cyclists
21st-century American women
Brevard College alumni
People from Rockford, Michigan
Inline speed skaters